York Centre is a provincial electoral district in Ontario, Canada, that has been the name of ridings in the Legislative Assembly of Ontario three different times. It was created initially in 1955 from the southern part of York North. It was dissolved in 1963 when it was split into three ridings called Yorkview, Downsview and Armourdale. In 1967, it was reconstituted north of Steeles in the township of Markham. This lasted until 1999 when it was dissolved into Markham—Unionville. The name was given to a new riding formed in its original location south of Steeles. It remains as an existing riding today.

Boundaries

1955 to 1963
The original boundaries consisted of Steeles Avenue West to the north, Yonge Street to the East, Lawrence Avenue West to the south and the Humber River to the west.

1963 to 1999

1999 to present
York Centre consists of the part of the City of Toronto within the North York district bounded on the north by the northern city limit, and on the east, south and west by a line drawn from the city limit south along Yonge Street, west along the hydroelectric transmission line north of Finch Avenue West, south along Bathurst Street, southeast along the Don River West Branch, southwest and west along Highway 401, north along Jane Street, east along Sheppard Avenue West, northwest along Black Creek, east along Grandravine Drive, and north along Keele Street to the city limit.

History
The provincial electoral district was created in 1999 when provincial ridings were defined to have the same borders as federal ridings.

Before 1999, the name York Centre was assigned to a completely different riding located in York Region north of Toronto with none of the same territory as the current York Centre. In 1999, much of the old York Centre was absorbed by the new riding of Vaughan—King—Aurora. The former riding was Wilson Heights.

Members of Provincial Parliament

Election results

2007 electoral reform referendum

Historic election results

1987 boundaries

1974 boundaries

1966 boundaries

1950s

References

Notes

Citations

External links
Elections Ontario Past Election Results
Map of riding for 2018 election

Ontario provincial electoral districts
North York
Provincial electoral districts of Toronto